In analytic geometry, spatial transformations in the 3-dimensional Euclidean space  are distinguished into active or alibi transformations, and passive or alias transformations. An active transformation is a transformation which actually changes the physical position (alibi, elsewhere) of a point, or rigid body, which can be defined in the absence of a coordinate system; whereas a passive transformation is merely a change in the coordinate system in which the object is described (alias, other name) (change of coordinate map, or change of basis). By transformation, mathematicians usually refer to active transformations, while physicists and engineers could mean either. Both types of transformation can be represented by a combination of a translation and a linear transformation.

Put differently, a passive transformation refers to description of the same object in two different coordinate systems.
On the other hand, an active transformation is a transformation of one or more objects with respect to the same coordinate system. For instance, active transformations are useful to describe successive positions of a rigid body. On the other hand, passive transformations may be useful in human motion analysis to observe the motion of the tibia relative to the femur, that is, its motion relative to a (local) coordinate system which moves together with the femur, rather than a (global) coordinate system which is fixed to the floor.

Example 

As an example, let the vector , be a vector in the plane.  A rotation of the vector through an angle θ in counterclockwise direction is given by the rotation matrix:

which can be viewed either as an active transformation or a passive transformation (where the above matrix will be inverted), as described below.

Spatial transformations in the Euclidean space R3 
In general a spatial transformation  may consist of a translation and a linear transformation. In the following, the translation will be omitted, and the linear transformation will be represented by a 3×3 matrix .

Active transformation
As an active transformation,  transforms the initial vector  into a new vector .

Note that active transformations make sense even as a linear transformation into a different vector space. It makes sense to write the new vector in the unprimed basis (as above) only when the transformation is from the space into itself.

Passive transformation 
On the other hand, when one views  as a passive transformation, the initial vector  is left unchanged, while the coordinate system and its basis vectors are transformed in the opposite direction, that is, with the inverse transformation . This gives a new coordinate system XYZ with basis vectors:

From this equation one sees that the new coordinates are given by

As a passive transformation  transforms the old coordinates into the new ones.

Note the equivalence between the two kinds of transformations: the coordinates of the new point in the active transformation and the new coordinates of the point in the passive transformation are the same, namely

In abstract vector spaces 

The distinction between active and passive transformations can be seen mathematically by considering abstract vector spaces. 

This basis provides an isomorphism  via the component map .

This is applied to the components: . The new basis  is determined by asking that , from which the expression  can be derived.

Nevertheless a choice of basis  allows construction of an isomorphism.

As left- and right-actions 

Often one restricts to the case where the maps are invertible, so that active transformations are the general linear group  of transformations while passive transformations are the group .

An active transformation  sends the basis . Meanwhile a passive transformation  sends the basis . 

This then gives a sharp distinction between active and passive transformations: active transformations act from the left on bases, while the  passive transformations act from the right, due to the inverse.

This observation is made more natural by viewing bases  as a choice of isomorphism . The space of bases is equivalently the space of such isomorphisms, denoted .

This turns the space of bases into a left -torsor and a right -torsor.

From a physical perspective, active transformations can be characterized as transformations of physical space, while passive transformations are characterized as redundancies in the description of physical space. This plays an important role in mathematical gauge theory, where gauge transformations are described mathematically by transition maps which act from the right on fibers.

See also
 Change of basis
 Covariance and contravariance of vectors
 Rotation of axes
 Translation of axes

References

 Dirk Struik (1953) Lectures on Analytic and Projective Geometry, page 84, Addison-Wesley.

External links
 UI ambiguity

Systems theory
Mathematical terminology
Concepts in physics